R. Andrew Murray is an American attorney who served as the United States Attorney for the United States District Court for the Western District of North Carolina from 2017 to 2021. He previously served as the elected District Attorney of Mecklenburg County, North Carolina. Prior to becoming the District Attorney of Mecklenburg County in 2011, Murray was an Assistant District Attorney in Mecklenburg County and a criminal defense attorney and managing partner in a North Carolina law firm. He enlisted in the United States Coast Guard in 1980 and was later commissioned as an officer in the United States Coast Guard Reserve. In 2016, he retired as a captain after 35 years of service.

Murray was recommended for the position of U.S. Attorney by Richard Burr and Thom Tillis, the U.S. senators from North Carolina. As a U.S. Attorney, Murray runs an office that prosecutes criminal and civil cases in an area covering 32 counties and 2.9 million people.

On November 9, 2017, he was confirmed to be the United States Attorney for the United States District Court for the Western District of North Carolina. He was sworn in on November 27, 2017. On February 8, 2021, he along with 55 other Trump-era attorneys were asked to resign. On February 16, he announced his resignation, effective February 28.

References

External links
 Biography at U.S. Department of Justice

Year of birth missing (living people)
Living people
North Carolina Republicans
21st-century American lawyers
North Carolina lawyers
University of North Carolina at Charlotte alumni
University of North Carolina School of Law alumni
United States Coast Guard captains
United States Attorneys for the Western District of North Carolina